The arrondissement of Palaiseau is an arrondissement of France in the Essonne department in the Île-de-France region. It has 68 communes.

Composition

The communes of the arrondissement of Palaiseau, and their INSEE codes, are:

 Angervilliers (91017)
 Arpajon (91021)
 Athis-Mons (91027)
 Avrainville (91041)
 Ballainvilliers (91044)
 Bièvres (91064)
 Boullay-les-Troux (91093)
 Brétigny-sur-Orge (91103)
 Breuillet (91105)
 Briis-sous-Forges (91111)
 Bruyères-le-Châtel (91115)
 Bures-sur-Yvette (91122)
 Champlan (91136)
 Cheptainville (91156)
 Chilly-Mazarin (91161)
 Courson-Monteloup (91186)
 Égly (91207)
 Épinay-sur-Orge (91216)
 Fontenay-lès-Briis (91243)
 Forges-les-Bains (91249)
 Gif-sur-Yvette (91272)
 Gometz-la-Ville (91274)
 Gometz-le-Châtel (91275)
 Guibeville (91292)
 Igny (91312)
 Janvry (91319)
 Juvisy-sur-Orge (91326)
 Leudeville (91332)
 Leuville-sur-Orge (91333)
 Limours (91338)
 Linas (91339)
 Longjumeau (91345)
 Longpont-sur-Orge (91347)
 Marcoussis (91363)
 Marolles-en-Hurepoix (91376)
 Massy (91377)
 Les Molières (91411)
 Montlhéry (91425)
 Morangis (91432)
 La Norville (91457)
 Nozay (91458)
 Ollainville (91461)
 Orsay (91471)
 Palaiseau (91477)
 Paray-Vieille-Poste (91479)
 Pecqueuse (91482)
 Le Plessis-Pâté (91494)
 Saclay (91534)
 Saint-Aubin (91538)
 Sainte-Geneviève-des-Bois (91549)
 Saint-Germain-lès-Arpajon (91552)
 Saint-Jean-de-Beauregard (91560)
 Saint-Maurice-Montcouronne (91568)
 Saint-Michel-sur-Orge (91570)
 Saint-Vrain (91579)
 Saulx-les-Chartreux (91587)
 Savigny-sur-Orge (91589)
 Les Ulis (91692)
 Vaugrigneuse (91634)
 Vauhallan (91635)
 Verrières-le-Buisson (91645)
 Villebon-sur-Yvette (91661)
 La Ville-du-Bois (91665)
 Villejust (91666)
 Villemoisson-sur-Orge (91667)
 Villiers-le-Bâcle (91679)
 Villiers-sur-Orge (91685)
 Wissous (91689)

History

The arrondissement of Palaiseau was created in 1962 as part of the department Seine-et-Oise. In 1968 it became part of the new department Essonne. At the January 2017 reorganisation of the arrondissements of Essonne, it received three communes from the arrondissement of Étampes.

As a result of the reorganisation of the cantons of France which came into effect in 2015, the borders of the cantons are no longer related to the borders of the arrondissements. The cantons of the arrondissement of Palaiseau were, as of January 2015:

 Arpajon
 Athis-Mons
 Bièvres
 Brétigny-sur-Orge
 Chilly-Mazarin
 Gif-sur-Yvette
 Juvisy-sur-Orge
 Limours
 Longjumeau
 Massy-Est
 Massy-Ouest
 Montlhéry
 Orsay
 Palaiseau
 Sainte-Geneviève-des-Bois
 Saint-Michel-sur-Orge
 Savigny-sur-Orge
 Les Ulis
 Villebon-sur-Yvette

Sub-prefects 
 Jean Dussourd : 1990-1992

References

Palaiseau